Zachary P. "Zack" Padilla (born March 15, 1963, in Glendora, California), and also known as Zack Attack, is a retired American boxer and a former WBO Light Welterweight champion.

Professional career
Padilla turned pro in 1985 and retired shortly thereafter in 1986 after a TKO loss to Dwayne Prim.

In 1991, he returned to boxing and went on a nine-fight winning streak, which included victories over future champion James Page and former champion Roger Mayweather, before challenging for a world title. In 1993, he captured the WBO Light Welterweight Title in an upset unanimous decision victory over undefeated Carlos Gonzalez. Later that year, he was named the Ring magazine comeback fighter of the year. Padilla successfully defended his title four times with victories over Efrem Calamati (35-0-1), Ray Oliveira, Harold Miller, and former champion Juan Laporte. His fight with Olivera in 1993 once held the Compubox record for the most punches thrown in a fight at 3,020.

Final retirement
During a sparring session with Shane Mosley, Padilla was hit with a hard punch which aggravated a head injury from his last fight. Padilla's boxing license was then suspended indefinitely, and he never fought again. He had a career record of 24-1-1 with 14 KOs.

Recognition
On June 25, 2012, Padilla was inducted into the California Boxing Hall of Fame.  This is in addition to having a street in his hometown of Azusa named in his honor.

Championships and accomplishments
 California Boxing Hall of Fame
 Class of 2012
 Cauliflower Alley Club
 Boxing Honoree (1993)
 World Boxing Organization
 WBO Light Welterweight Championship (one time)

References 

 

1963 births
Living people
American boxers of Mexican descent
Boxers from California
World boxing champions
American male boxers
People from Glendora, California
Light-welterweight boxers
People from Azusa, California